Andrea Appiani (31 May 17548 November 1817) was an Italian neoclassical painter.

Life
Born in Milan, it had been intended that he follow his father's career in medicine but instead entered the private academy of the painter Carlo Maria Giudici (1723–1804) where he received instruction in drawing, copying mainly from sculpture and prints. From there, he then joined the class of the fresco painter Antonio de' Giorgi, which was held at the Ambrosiana picture gallery in Milan. At the same time, he also frequented the studio of Martin Knoller, where his   knowledge of painting in oils was deepened. Also, he studied anatomy at the Ospedale Maggiore in Milan with the sculptor Gaetano Monti.

Appiani's interest in aesthetic issues was stimulated by the classical poet Giuseppe Parini, whom he drew in two fine pencil portraits. In 1776 he entered the Brera Academy of Fine Arts to follow the painting courses of Giulio Traballesi, receiving a mastery of the fresco technique. Among his masterpieces are the frescoes depicting the four evangelists and doctors of the church that he painted for the cupola and pendentives for the church of Santa Maria presso San Celso in 1795 and the fresco with The Parnassus, representing Apollo and the Muses, on the ceiling of the dining room of Royal Villa of Milan. Another masterpiece are the frescoes depicting Allegories of Virtues and others honoring Napoleon in the rooms of the Royal Palace of Milan.

Although created a pensioned artist to the Kingdom of Italy by Napoleon, Appiani lost his allowance after the fall of the Kingdom in 1814 and fell into poverty.
During his period as court painter he rendered portraits of Napoleon and the chief personages of his regime, among the most graceful of which are his oil paintings Venus and Love, and Rinaldo in the garden of Armida. 
He is known as "the elder", to distinguish him from his great-nephew Andrea Appiani, an historical painter in Rome.

Appiani painted a large canvas of the Encounter of Rachel and Jacob for a church in Alzano. 
The Brera has a fresco by Appiani representing Olympus.

He died at Milan in 1817. 
Among his pupils are Antonio De Antoni, Carlo Prajer, Angelo Monticelli, and Giuseppe Bossi.

Gallery

References

Notes:

Sources:
 
 Domenico Sedini, Andrea Appiani, online catalogue Artgate by Fondazione Cariplo, 2010, CC BY-SA.

External links
Appiani, Andrea
«Apotheosis of Napoleon» by Appiani Andrea in Art Reproductions Gallery

1754 births
1817 deaths
18th-century Italian painters
Italian male painters
19th-century Italian painters
Italian neoclassical painters
Italian muralists
Court painters
Painters from Milan
Brera Academy alumni
19th-century Italian male artists
18th-century Italian male artists